John Michell (1724–1793) was an English scientist.

John Michell may also refer to:
John Henry Michell (1863–1940), Australian mathematician
John Michell (writer) (1933–2009), English writer on esotericism
John Ralph Michell (1861–1947), Canadian politician
John Michell, List of Lord Mayors of London#15th century
John Michell (MP for New Shoreham) (died 1546), English politician
John Michell (MP for Horsham) (died 1555), MP for Horsham
Sir John Michell (British Army officer) (1781–1866), Royal Artillery general

See also
John Michel (disambiguation)
John Michels (born 1973), American football offensive tackle
John Michels (guard) (born 1931)
John Mitchell (disambiguation)